Gary Olson may refer to:

 Gary Olson (political scientist) (fl. 1970s–1990s), professor of political science
 Gary A. Olson (born 1954), scholar of rhetoric and culture
 Gary M. Olson (born 1944), professor specializing in the fields of human-computer interaction and computer supported cooperative work

See also
 Gary Olsen (1957–2000), English actor